Dillberry Lake Provincial Park  is a provincial park in Alberta, Canada, located  north from Provost and  south of Chauvin along Highway 17.

The park surrounds Killarney Lake, Leane Lake and Dillberry Lake, as well as other small lakes. It was established on January 8, 1957 and is maintained by Alberta Tourism, Parks and Recreation.

Activities
The following activities are available in the park:
Beach activities (on two beaches, a day use beach and a campers beach) include sailing, swimming, water-skiing, windsurfing
Birdwatching (the park is part of the Killarney, Dillberry & Leane Lakes Important Bird Area (IBA); bird species include ducks, geese, swans, herons, hermit thrush, lark sparrows, marsh wrens, yellow-headed blackbirds, western meadowlarks and Sprague's pipits)
Camping
Canoeing and kayaking
Cross-country skiing
Fishing and ice fishing (for rainbow trout)
Front country hiking (Loon Loop and Ranger Loop are maintained trails)
Horseshoes
Power boating

See also
List of provincial parks in Alberta
List of Canadian provincial parks
List of National Parks of Canada

References

External links

Provincial parks of Alberta
Important Bird Areas of Alberta
Municipal District of Wainwright No. 61
1957 establishments in Alberta
Protected areas established in 1957